The arrondissement of Gap is an arrondissement of France in the Hautes-Alpes department in the Provence-Alpes-Côte d'Azur region. It has 126 communes.

Composition

The communes of the arrondissement of Gap, and their INSEE codes, are:
 
 Ancelle (05004)
 Aspremont (05008)
 Aspres-lès-Corps (05009)
 Aspres-sur-Buëch (05010)
 Aubessagne (05039)
 Avançon (05011)
 Baratier (05012)
 Barcillonnette (05013)
 Barret-sur-Méouge (05014)
 La Bâtie-Montsaléon (05016)
 La Bâtie-Neuve (05017)
 La Bâtie-Vieille (05018)
 La Beaume (05019)
 Le Bersac (05021)
 Bréziers (05022)
 Buissard (05025)
 Chabestan (05028)
 Chabottes (05029)
 Champoléon (05032)
 Chanousse (05033)
 La Chapelle-en-Valgaudémar (05064)
 Châteauneuf-d'Oze (05035)
 Châteauroux-les-Alpes (05036)
 Châteauvieux (05037)
 Chorges (05040)
 Crévoux (05044)
 Crots (05045)
 Dévoluy (05139)
 Embrun (05046)
 Éourres (05047)
 L'Épine (05048)
 Esparron (05049)
 Espinasses (05050)
 Étoile-Saint-Cyrice (05051)
 La Fare-en-Champsaur (05054)
 La Faurie (05055)
 Forest-Saint-Julien (05056)
 Fouillouse (05057)
 La Freissinouse (05059)
 Furmeyer (05060)
 Gap (05061)
 Garde-Colombe (05053)
 Le Glaizil (05062)
 La Haute-Beaume (05066)
 Jarjayes (05068)
 Laragne-Montéglin (05070)
 Lardier-et-Valença (05071)
 Laye (05072)
 Lazer (05073)
 Lettret (05074)
 Manteyer (05075)
 Méreuil (05076)
 Monêtier-Allemont (05078)
 Montbrand (05080)
 Montclus (05081)
 Montgardin (05084)
 Montjay (05086)
 Montmaur (05087)
 Montrond (05089)
 La Motte-en-Champsaur (05090)
 Moydans (05091)
 Neffes (05092)
 Nossage-et-Bénévent (05094)
 Le Noyer (05095)
 Orcières (05096)
 Orpierre (05097)
 Les Orres (05098)
 Oze (05099)
 Pelleautier (05100)
 La Piarre (05102)
 Le Poët (05103)
 Poligny (05104)
 Prunières (05106)
 Puy-Saint-Eusèbe (05108)
 Puy-Sanières (05111)
 Rabou (05112)
 Rambaud (05113)
 Réallon (05114)
 Remollon (05115)
 Ribeyret (05117)
 Rochebrune (05121)
 La Roche-des-Arnauds (05123)
 La Rochette (05124)
 Rosans (05126)
 Rousset (05127)
 Saint-André-d'Embrun (05128)
 Saint-André-de-Rosans (05129)
 Saint-Apollinaire (05130)
 Saint-Auban-d'Oze (05131)
 Saint-Bonnet-en-Champsaur (05132)
 Sainte-Colombe (05135)
 Saint-Étienne-le-Laus (05140)
 Saint-Firmin (05142)
 Saint-Jacques-en-Valgodemard (05144)
 Saint-Jean-Saint-Nicolas (05145)
 Saint-Julien-en-Beauchêne (05146)
 Saint-Julien-en-Champsaur (05147)
 Saint-Laurent-du-Cros (05148)
 Saint-Léger-les-Mélèzes (05149)
 Saint-Maurice-en-Valgodemard (05152)
 Saint-Michel-de-Chaillol (05153)
 Saint-Pierre-Avez (05155)
 Saint-Pierre-d'Argençon (05154)
 Saint-Sauveur (05156)
 Le Saix (05158)
 Saléon (05159)
 Salérans (05160)
 La Saulce (05162)
 Le Sauze-du-Lac (05163)
 Savines-le-Lac (05164)
 Savournon (05165)
 Serres (05166)
 Sigottier (05167)
 Sigoyer (05168)
 Sorbiers (05169)
 Tallard (05170)
 Théus (05171)
 Trescléoux (05172)
 Upaix (05173)
 Val Buëch-Méouge (05118)
 Valdoule (05024)
 Valserres (05176)
 Ventavon (05178)
 Veynes (05179)
 Villar-Loubière (05182)
 Vitrolles (05184)

History

The arrondissement of Gap was created in 1800.

As a result of the reorganisation of the cantons of France which came into effect in 2015, the borders of the cantons are no longer related to the borders of the arrondissements. The cantons of the arrondissement of Gap were, as of January 2015:

 Aspres-sur-Buëch
 Barcillonnette
 La Bâtie-Neuve
 Chorges
 Embrun
 Gap-Campagne
 Gap-Centre
 Gap-Nord-Est
 Gap-Nord-Ouest
 Gap-Sud-Est
 Gap-Sud-Ouest
 Laragne-Montéglin
 Orcières
 Orpierre
 Ribiers
 Rosans
 Saint-Bonnet-en-Champsaur
 Saint-Étienne-en-Dévoluy
 Saint-Firmin
 Savines-le-Lac
 Serres
 Tallard
 Veynes

References

Gap